Arzei Habira is a Haredi neighborhood in Jerusalem. It is bordered by Ma'alot Dafna to the north, Shmuel HaNavi to the west, Beit Yisrael to the south, and Road 1 and Sheikh Jarrah to the east.

Etymology
Arzei Habira literally means "Cedars of the Capital", referring to Jerusalem.

History
Arzei Habira was established after the 1967 Six-Day War in an area which had previously been classified as no-man's land bordering Ramat Eshkol. It was originally considered a sub-neighborhood of Ma'alot Dafna, which was developed around the same time, although it developed its own character and is now known as a separate neighborhood. It is a densely developed area of high quality apartment housing situated around a large, central grass park. It is home to more than 200 families.

Notable residents
Mordechai Shakovitsky was the rabbi of Arzei Habira as well as the posek for neighboring Yeshivat Ohr Somayach from 1977 until his death in 1998.
Yosef Efrati, aide to Rabbi Yosef Shalom Eliashiv
Chaim Yaakov Goldvicht, rosh yeshiva, Kerem B'Yavneh
 Yaakov Hillel
Chaim Tzvi Yair Senter, rosh yeshiva, Yeshiva Aderes HaTorah
Hanoch Teller

References

Neighbourhoods of Jerusalem